The 1963 ICF Canoe Sprint World Championships were held in Jajce, Yugoslavia (present-day Bosnia and Herzegovina). This event was held under the auspices of the International Canoe Federation.

The men's competition consisted of four Canadian (single paddle, open boat) and nine kayak events. Three events were held for the women, all in kayak. The women's K-4 500 m event debuted at these championships.

This was the sixth championships in canoe sprint.

Medal summary

Men's

Canoe

Kayak

Women's

Kayak

Medals table

References
 ICF medalists for Olympic and World Championships – Part 1: flatwater (now sprint): 1936–2007.
 ICF medalists for Olympic and World Championships – Part 2: rest of flatwater (now sprint) and remaining canoeing disciplines: 1936–2007.
 Results at Canoeresults.eu

Icf Canoe Sprint World Championships, 1963
Icf Canoe Sprint World Championships, 1963
ICF Canoe Sprint World Championships
International sports competitions hosted by Yugoslavia
Canoeing and kayaking competitions in Yugoslavia